Transportation network may refer to:

 Transport network, physical infrastructure
 Transportation network (graph theory), the mathematical graph theory
 Transportation network company, a legal term for a ridesharing company in certain jurisdictions